The 1947 Iowa State Cyclones football team represented Iowa State College of Agricultural and Mechanic Arts (later renamed Iowa State University) in the Big Six Conference during the 1947 college football season. In their first year under head coach Abe Stuber, the Cyclones compiled a 3–6 record (1–4 against conference opponents), finished in fifth place in the conference, and were outscored by opponents by a combined total of 141 to 111. They played their home games at Clyde Williams Field in Ames, Iowa.

The team's statistical leaders included Webb Halbert with 464 rushing yards, Ron Norman with 504 passing yards, Dean Laun with 246 receiving yards, and Harley Rollinger with 21 points (three field goals and 12 extra points). Webb Halbert was the only Iowa State player to be selected as a first-team all-conference player.

The team's regular starting lineup consisted of left end Dean Laun, left tackle Tom Southard, left guard Joe Brubaker, center Rod Rust, right guard Norman Anderson, right tackle Harley Rollinger, right end Bob Jensen, quarterback Don Ferguson, left halfback Webb Halbert, right halfback Vic Weber, and fullback Ray Klootwyk. Rollinger and Weber were the team captains.

Schedule

References

Iowa State
Iowa State Cyclones football seasons
Iowa State Cyclones football